Tenth Army or 10th Army may refer to:

Germany
 10th Army (German Empire), a World War I field Army
 10th Army (Wehrmacht), a World War II field army

Russia  
 10th Army (Russian Empire)
 10th Army (RSFSR)
 10th Army (Soviet Union)
 10th Guards Army (Soviet Union)

Others
 Tenth Army (France)
 Tenth Army (United Kingdom)
 Tenth Army (Italy)
 Tenth Army (Austria-Hungary)
 Tenth Army (Japan)
 Tenth United States Army

See also
 10th Corps (disambiguation)
 10th Division (disambiguation)
 10th Wing (disambiguation)
 10th Brigade (disambiguation)
 10th Regiment (disambiguation)
 10 Squadron (disambiguation)
 10th Battalion (disambiguation)